Postland railway station was a station on the Great Northern and Great Eastern Joint Railway in Crowland, Lincolnshire, which is now closed. It originally opened in 1867, and remained open to passengers until 1961. It was closed permanently in 1965. Services to Cambridge and Doncaster ran from here.

The station building and former signal box now lie on the B1166, which runs from Crowland to Throckenholt, and the station building has now been converted into a house. Train passengers from Crowland and the surrounding area must use either Spalding railway station or Peterborough railway station.

References

External links
 Postland station on navigable 1946 O. S. map

Disused railway stations in Lincolnshire
Former Great Northern and Great Eastern Joint Railway stations
Railway stations in Great Britain opened in 1867
Railway stations in Great Britain closed in 1961